Kalatun may refer to:
 Kalatun, Fars